The grey-headed nigrita (Nigrita canicapillus) is a common species of estrildid finch found in Africa. It has an estimated global extent of occurrence of 3,700,000 km2.

It is widespread throughout the African tropical rainforest.

The status of the species is evaluated as Least Concern.

References

BirdLife Species Factsheet

grey-headed nigrita
grey-headed nigrita